Camille Kaye Cooper (born February 5, 1979) is a former professional basketball player. She played for the New York Liberty in 2001 and 2002. She played a total of 27 games.

College
During Cooper's collegiate career she led the team in field goal percentage (.622) and blocks (1.7 per game).

Purdue statistics
Source

Statistics leaders

Personal life
After basketball, Cooper became an attorney.

References

External links
Purdue bio

1979 births
Living people
American lawyers
American women's basketball players
Basketball players from Kentucky
Centers (basketball)
Duke University School of Law alumni
Kentucky women in law
Los Angeles Sparks draft picks
New York Liberty players
People from Georgetown, Kentucky
Purdue Boilermakers women's basketball players
Sportswomen from Kentucky